Acacia stictophylla, also known as Dandenong Range cinnamon wattle,  is a species of Acacia that is endemic to Victoria, Australia. The species was first formally described in the botanical journal Muelleria in 2009. Previous to this it was included in the species Acacia leprosa and was often referred to as the "Dandenong Range variant".
It is listed as  "Rare in Victoria" on the Department of Sustainability and Environment's Advisory List of Rare Or Threatened Plants In Victoria.

References

stictophylla
Flora of Victoria (Australia)
Fabales of Australia
Plants described in 2009
Taxa named by Bruce Maslin
Taxa named by Daniel J. Murphy